Leonardo "Léo" André Pimenta Faria (born November 18, 1982) is a Brazilian footballer, who plays as a midfielder for Olaria.

Club career
He joined Sanat Naft in summer 2007 and had a very good season but after the relegation of the team he had to leave the club. In 2009, he returned to Iran and signed for Tractor Sazi. He was loaned out to Boavista Sport Club in 2010.

Gostaresh Foolad
He returned to Tabriz in 2014 and a one–year deal with Gostaresh Foolad. His contract expired in the summer of 2015, but he later re–signed with the club in winter of 2016. On 4 March 2016 Pimenta scored a brace against Esteghlal Ahvaz in a 4–0 victory.

Club Career Statistics

 Assist Goals

References

External links
Leonardo Pimenta official site
Léo Pimenta at ZeroZero

1982 births
Living people
Footballers from Rio de Janeiro (city)
Brazilian footballers
Brazilian expatriate footballers
FC Porto B players
F.C. Marco players
Tractor S.C. players
Sanat Naft Abadan F.C. players
Duque de Caxias Futebol Clube players
Hatta Club players
Al Hamriyah Club players
Khor Fakkan Sports Club players
Audax Rio de Janeiro Esporte Clube players
Boavista Sport Club players
Al-Mujazzal Club players
Olaria Atlético Clube players
Campeonato Brasileiro Série B players
Campeonato Brasileiro Série D players
Persian Gulf Pro League players
UAE First Division League players
Saudi Second Division players
Association football midfielders
Brazilian expatriate sportspeople in Iran
Brazilian expatriate sportspeople in the United Arab Emirates
Brazilian expatriate sportspeople in Saudi Arabia
Expatriate footballers in Iran
Expatriate footballers in the United Arab Emirates
Expatriate footballers in Saudi Arabia